Joanna Coull (born 4 February 1973) is a retired British international swimmer. Coull competed in two events at the 1988 Summer Olympics. She represented England in the 200 metres and 400 metres freestyle and won a silver medal in the 4 x 200 metres freestyle relay, at the 1990 Commonwealth Games in Auckland, New Zealand. She also won the 1989 ASA National Championship title in the 200 metres freestyle.

References

External links
 

1973 births
Living people
British female swimmers
Olympic swimmers of Great Britain
Swimmers at the 1988 Summer Olympics
Sportspeople from Banbury
Commonwealth Games medallists in swimming
Commonwealth Games silver medallists for England
Swimmers at the 1990 Commonwealth Games
20th-century British women
Medallists at the 1990 Commonwealth Games